Duane Anthony James (born January 20, 1983 in New York City) is a professional basketball player. He's known for being LeBron James' cousin.

Pro career

He played at Miami Dade Junior College. He completed his last two years of college at Binghamton University (NCAA), averaging 7.6 points and 4.7 rebounds in 20.7 minutes per game during his senior year.

He began his professional experience in Europe in the 2007-08 season, where he played in the first division of Denmark for the Horsholm 79ers. He achieved some spectacular numbers: 15.3 points, 6.3 rebounds, 1.4 assists and 1.8 steals. He was selected to play the All Star 2008. The following year, he went to the UK to play for the PAWS London Capital of the British Basketball League and then for the Leicester Riders.

The 2009-10 season he arrived to Spain after being the third leading scorer in the British Basketball League, with 19.9 points per game, and third best stealer with 2.7 per game. His destination was the CB Guadalajara, but before the end of the year he returned to the UK and BBL to play again for the Leicester Riders, where he averaged 11.4 points, 3.9 rebounds and 1.2 assists, helping the team to reach the semifinals of the playoffs for the title.

In January 2014 he joined the Cáceres 2016 Basket. In the 2015/16 season, he played for Fundación CB Granada, where he averaged 12.5 points, 6.3 rebounds, 1.2 assists and 1.1 steals per game.

References

External links
Eurobasket.com profile
RealGM profile

1983 births
Living people
American expatriate basketball people in Antigua and Barbuda
American expatriate basketball people in Bolivia
American expatriate basketball people in Denmark
American expatriate basketball people in El Salvador
American expatriate basketball people in Nicaragua
American expatriate basketball people in Panama
American expatriate basketball people in Spain
American expatriate basketball people in the United Kingdom
American men's basketball players
Basketball players from New York City
Binghamton Bearcats men's basketball players
Cáceres Ciudad del Baloncesto players
CB Guadalajara players
Hørsholm 79ers players
Leicester Riders players
London Lions (basketball) players
Miami Dade Sharks men's basketball players
Oviedo CB players
Power forwards (basketball)